Elizabeth "Betty" R. Groff (née Herr, September 14, 1935 – November 8, 2015) was an American celebrity chef, cookbook author, and authority on Pennsylvania Dutch cuisine. Groff authored six cookbooks focusing on Pennsylvania Dutch foods, including Good Earth and Country Cooking, which Time magazine called "one of the top five regional cookbooks introduced in 1981." 

In 2015, The Patriot-News further praised her contributions to regional food traditions, writing "Groff was to Pennsylvania Dutch food what the late chef Paul Prudhomme was to Cajun cooking."

Formative years
Groff was born in Strasburg, Pennsylvania, to  Clarence N. and Bertha K. Root Herr. She was a 10th generation Pennsylvania Mennonite and a direct descendant of Hans Herr. She married her husband, Abram B. Groff, on November 12, 1955.

Career
In November 2014, The New York Times selected Groff's recipe for glazed bacon to represent Pennsylvania in a survey of Thanksgiving foods from all 50 U.S. states.

Death
Betty Groff died at the age of eighty on November 8, 2015.

Bibliography
Groff, Betty; Stoneback, Diane Williamson. Betty Groff Cookbook: Pennsylvania German Recipes, Harrisburg, Pennsylvania, RB Books, 2001.
Groff, Betty. Betty Groff's Pennsylvania Dutch Cookbook, New York, Galahad Books, 1996.

References

1935 births
2015 deaths
American cookbook writers
American Mennonites
Pennsylvania Dutch people
American people of Swiss-German descent
American television chefs
Pennsylvania Dutch cuisine
People from Lancaster County, Pennsylvania
People from Strasburg, Pennsylvania
American women chefs
Writers from Pennsylvania
Mennonite writers